The first Centre for Human Communication was founded in 1971 by Kevin Kingsland, a member of the Publications & Communications Board  of the British Psychological Society and Venika Kingsland in Devon, England, to provide an intentional centre for personal and community development.

They proposed that human communication is the basis of society and the creator of community and that through deep human communication comes the most positive of human experience: co-operation, sharing, harmony, peace, love and creativity.

A founding principle of the Centre was that the quality of our culture depends on the quality of our communication. Education, scientific advance, artistic elevation and personal expansion are made possible through human communication.

Purpose of the Centre
The purpose of the Centre for Human Communication was articulated in its 1978 Education Prospectus: "The centres are more like living organisms than rigid institutions. In recent years the pace of life has quickened and many organisations have been unable to respond appropriately to the revolution that is taking place in the world. Humankind is participating in a global renaissance. The Centres for Human Communication are committed to the positive evolution of humanity through the power of creativity, communication and consciousness. Apart from this the Centres have no philosophy, doctrine or affiliation whatsoever."

Achievements
Kingsland's seven level colour model, Spectrum Theory, formed the core of the Centre's pioneering research into human communication, personal and organisational development. The outcome was a cascade of new perspectives on work, many of which were described by Ronnie Lessem in his series of books on Intrapreneurship, Quality and Management. Work on Vision was one of the centre's earliest achievements at the beginning of the 1970s. The original Vision to Action model (later also called Vision to Reality) was invented at this time by Kevin Kingsland and shared through hundreds of seminars and communication groups. It is a seven level model which describes the way a vision incarnates as it unfolds through the levels of the mind and is reified. Spectrum Theory Subsequently tens of thousands of businesses were set up using the Vision to Action/Reality process.

In parallel with the development of the Centre a new business model emerged which became known as The Community Company. The first Community Company was incorporated as Grael Associates Limited and became the trading face of the Centre. Together they formed a whole, rather like Yin yang. The Centre and Grael provided complementary learning and development opportunities for people.

Development
Like any true growth centre, the original centre itself grew and replicated reflecting the growth of the individuals who manifest the Centre. Subsequently other centres emerged in Britain: Torquay, Exeter, Carlisle, Westbury. Others were established abroad, some physical and some virtual. Like any developed human being each centre is unique although all centres have certain features in common. It is the view of the founders that ultimately there is only one Centre.

Many individuals have been inspired by this, and have made use of it in related disciplines and professions.

Some examples:

Personal development:
-  IDT http://www.idttraining.com/
-  Quarto http://www.quartoconsulting.co.uk/

Yoga:
- Jenny Adams http://www.hoho.co.uk/html/jenni_adams.html
- Jane Mackarness https://web.archive.org/web/20080404064718/http://www.classicalyoga.co.uk/profile.htm and http://www.hoho.co.uk/html/mackarness.html

Computing and communications
- CoreSupport Ltd https://web.archive.org/web/20080205072111/http://www.core-support.co.uk/

References

External links
Centre For Human Communication, Exeter 
Centre for Human Communication, Torquay 
Interview with Kevin Kingsland 

Personal development